Biarritz station (French: Gare de Biarritz) is a railway station in Biarritz, Nouvelle-Aquitaine, France. The station is located on the Bordeaux–Irun railway line. The station is served by TGV (high speed trains), Intercités de Nuit (night trains), Intercités (long distance), and TER (local) services operated by the SNCF.

Train services
The following services currently call at Biarritz:
high speed services (TGV) Paris - Bordeaux - Hendaye
intercity services (Intercités) Hendaye - Bayonne - Pau - Tarbes - Toulouse
local service (TER Nouvelle-Aquitaine) Bordeaux - Dax - Bayonne - Hendaye

Gallery

References

Railway stations in Pyrénées-Atlantiques
Biarritz
Railway stations in France opened in 1864